is a former Japanese football player and manager. He played for Japan national team.

Club career
Imanishi was born in Hiroshima on January 12, 1941. After graduating from Tokyo University of Education, he joined his local club Toyo Industries (later Mazda) in 1963. In 1965, Toyo Industries joined new league Japan Soccer League. The club won the champions for 4 years in a row (1965-1968). The club also won 1965, 1967 and 1969 Emperor's Cup. He retired in 1969. He played 42 games in the league. He was selected Best Eleven in 1966.

National team career
In December 1966, Imanishi was selected Japan national team for 1966 Asian Games. At this competition, on December 10, he debuted against India. He played 3 games for Japan in 1966.

Coaching career
After retirement, Imanishi became a manager for Mazda as Teruo Nimura successor in 1984. This season was the first season the club was relegated to Division 2. He promoted the club to Division 1 in 1986. In 1987, he resigned a manager and Hans Ooft became a manager. However, the club was relegated to Division 2 again in 1988. Imanishi became a manager as successor Ooft again in 1988. Imanishi promoted the club to Division 1 in 1991 and he resigned in 1992. From 1994, he worked for Japan Football Association until 2002. He also served as president at FC Gifu from 2008 to 2012.

Club statistics

National team statistics

Awards
 Japan Soccer League Best Eleven: 1966

References

External links
 
 Japan National Football Team Database

1941 births
Living people
University of Tsukuba alumni
Association football people from Hiroshima Prefecture
Japanese footballers
Japan international footballers
Japan Soccer League players
Sanfrecce Hiroshima players
Asian Games medalists in football
Asian Games bronze medalists for Japan
Footballers at the 1966 Asian Games
Japanese football managers
Japanese football chairmen and investors
Hibakusha
Association football defenders
Medalists at the 1966 Asian Games